Jomfruland is a small elongated Norwegian island located off the coast of mainland Kragerø in the county of Vestfold og Telemark, about 2 km south of the island of Stråholmen. It measures about 7.5 km by 1 km. Jomfruland provides shelter to the many islands of the Kragerø archipelago from the Skagerrak seas.

Approximately on the island's center there are two white lighthouses – one old and one new. Only the newer is in use today. The lighthouses are most characteristic and can be seen from all sides. These towers are often referred to as the characterizing feature of Kragerø and the archipelago.

Access to Jomfruland is by water taxi, car ferry, or by private vessel. The island has several guest harbours. The island has several attractions, among which are splendid beaches, developed docks with restaurant and kiosk facilities, rolling stone beaches on the island's north side, as well as good hiking possibilities for tourists and residents alike.

Name etymology

The meaning of the name is 'virgin (is)land' (probably The Blessed/Holy Virgin Mary, but also possibly because the island 'dives', like the virgins, in high sea.) - but this is a poetic name first mentioned in 1520. The name of the island in Norse time was Aur (from Norse aurr 'gravel, shingle' - the whole island is a moraine that was made during the ice age).

Plant and animal life
Jomfruland is famous for it abundance of European thimbleweed, a feature which made it a location for the 1995 Norwegian movie production of Sigrid Undset's Kristin Lavransdatter. Every spring, in the beginning of May, the white thimbleweed spreads out like a blanket across the island.

The island is also known for its rich bird life, with more than 300 species having been spotted. Jomfruland Bird Station (Jomfruland Fuglestasjon) is a facility run by the Telemark chapter of the Norwegian Ornithological Society. The station which was established in 1969 is located at Øitangen on the northern peak of the island. Much of the bird migration each spring and autumn follows the coastline and passes by the island's northern peak. From March through November the station is staffed continuously. Many civilian service personnel have been deployed here since the 1990s, and these together with other persons in short-term employment have provided the backbone of the service which however also benefits from many volunteer workers.

Due to the island's diverse plant life, a relatively large number of nesting bird species have been documented. As of March 2006, 92 species were breeding, and of these, approximately 40-50 every year. The barred warbler is one of the regular species with Jomfruland perhaps being the only location in Norway where this bird breeds. Also thrush nightingale, common rosefinch and red-backed shrike are regular breeding species, whereas more irregular finds are of greenish warbler (1992 – only breeding observation in Norway), stock pigeon, northern shoveler and barnacle goose (the latter two on nearby islands). A vast number of birds breed on islets and skerries around Jomfruland, one of these being the black guillemot.

Geology 
Geologically, Jomfruland is part of a large residual moraine from the Ice Age called the Ra step. Jomfruland is the product of the back parts of the moraine (Ra) sticking out of the water. Eastward, the moraine remains underwater from Jomfruland to Mølen in Brunlanes, before it reappears after crossing Tromøy. Where the Ra is connected to the mainland it forms pebble beaches. Between Jomfruland and Tromøy there are shallow waters in places where the moraine almost reaches the water surface.

Islands of Vestfold og Telemark
Kragerø
Moraines of Europe
Glacial deposits of Norway